The Hinesville metropolitan area (officially Hinesville, GA Metropolitan Statistical Area and previously the Hinesville–Ft. Stewart, GA Metropolitan Statistical Area) is defined by the United States Census Bureau as a metropolitan area consisting of two counties – Liberty and Long – in the U.S. state of Georgia. It is anchored by the city of Hinesville and encompasses all of Fort Stewart, one of the largest U.S. Army installations in the United States. The metro area's latest population estimate from the U.S. Census Bureau was 80,495 in 2018.

The Hinesville Metropolitan Statistical Area is part of a larger trading area, the Savannah–Hinesville–Statesboro Combined Statistical Area.

Counties
Liberty
Long

Communities
Allenhurst
Flemington
Fort Stewart (Census-designated place)
Gumbranch
Hinesville (Principal city)
Ludowici
Midway
Riceboro
Walthourville

Demographics
As of the census of 2000, there were 71,914 people, 22,957 households, and 17,814 families residing in the MSA. The racial makeup of the MSA was 49.76% White, 40.18% African American, 0.55% Native American, 1.59% Asian, 0.41% Pacific Islander, 4.36% from other races, and 3.15% from two or more races. Hispanic or Latino of any race were 8.19% of the population.

The median income for a household in the MSA was $32,059, and the median income for a family was $33,752. Males had a median income of $25,861 versus $19,749 for females. The per capita income for the MSA was $13,221.

See also
Georgia statistical areas
List of municipalities in Georgia (U.S. state)

References

 
Metropolitan areas of Georgia (U.S. state)